Andrew Kozek (born May 26, 1986) is a Canadian former professional ice hockey player. Kozek was drafted 53rd overall by the Atlanta Thrashers in the 2005 NHL Entry Draft.

Playing career
Kozek played collegiately at the University of North Dakota from 2005 to 2009. He helped UND capture the WCHA championship in 2006, followed by a trip to the NCAA Frozen Four, where the Fighting Sioux were defeated by Boston College. In 2007, UND again made it to the NCAA Frozen Four and again fells short in the semifinal against Boston College. Kozek reached a third NCAA Frozen Four with North Dakota in 2008, but for the third consecutive year the Fighting Hawks did not get passed BC in the semis. Kozek was named to the WCHA All-Academic Team his junior year.

After his NCAA career, Kozek played for the Chicago Wolves in the American Hockey League, seeing action in five games of the 2008-09 season. He then signed a deal with the Atlanta Thrashers and was assigned to their affiliate, the Chicago Wolves, where he made 126 AHL appearances. On March 7, 2011, Kozek was sent by the Thrashers on loan to the Hershey Bears, affiliate of the Washington Capitals, in exchange for Capitals prospect Josh Godfrey.

In the following season, Kozek embarked on his career abroad, first agreeing to a one-year stint in the Asia League Ice Hockey with the Nikko Ice Bucks. He then moved to the more competitive Austrian top-flight EBEL with Dornbirner EC for the 2012-13 campaign. He led the league in goalscoring that season, chipping in with 38 goals (plus 20 assists) in 54 games. After one year at Dornbirn, Kozek moved to EBEL rivals EHC Linz prior to the 2013-14 season. He led the Austrian top-flight in goals scored in 2012-13 and 2015-16.

In April 2016, Kozek penned a deal with the Nürnberg Ice Tigers of the German top-tier Deutsche Eishockey Liga (DEL).

Career statistics

References

External links

1986 births
Living people
Atlanta Thrashers draft picks
EHC Black Wings Linz players
Canadian ice hockey forwards
Chicago Wolves players
Dornbirn Bulldogs players
Hershey Bears players
EC KAC players
Mora IK players
Nikkō Ice Bucks players
North Dakota Fighting Hawks men's ice hockey players
Ravensburg Towerstars players
Ice hockey people from British Columbia
Thomas Sabo Ice Tigers players
Vaasan Sport players
Canadian expatriate ice hockey players in Austria
Canadian expatriate ice hockey players in Finland
Canadian expatriate ice hockey players in Germany
Canadian expatriate ice hockey players in Sweden